John Lancelot Mounsey (2 June 1890 – 21 March 1970) was an Australian rules footballer who played with Collingwood in the Victorian Football League (VFL).

Notes

External links 

Lance Mounsey's profile at Collingwood Forever

1890 births
1970 deaths
Australian rules footballers from Victoria (Australia)
Collingwood Football Club players